The toco toucan (Ramphastos toco), also known as the common toucan or giant toucan, is the largest and probably the best known species in the toucan family. It is found in semi-open habitats throughout a large part of central and eastern South America. It is a common attraction in zoos.

Taxonomy and systematics
German zoologist Philipp Ludwig Statius Müller described the toco toucan in 1776.

Subspecies 
Two subspecies are recognized:
 R. t. toco  - Statius Müller, 1776: Found in the Guianas, northern and north-eastern Brazil and south-eastern Peru
 R. t. albogularis - Cabanis, 1862: Originally described as a separate species. Found in eastern and southern Brazil, northern Bolivia, Paraguay and northern Argentina

Description
The toco toucan has conspicuously contrasting plumage with a mainly black body, a white throat, chest and uppertail-coverts, and red undertail-coverts. What appears to be a blue iris is actually thin blue skin around the eye. This blue skin is surrounded by another ring of bare, orange skin. It looks heavy, but as in other toucans it is relatively light because the inside largely is hollow. The tongue is nearly as long as the bill and very flat. This species is the largest toucan and the largest representative of the order Piciformes. Other than the size difference, there are no external differences between the sexes. Juveniles are duller and shorter-billed than adults. Its voice consists of a deep, coarse croaking, often repeated every few seconds. It also has a rattling call and will bill-clack.

Bill

The bill is serrated and is the largest relative to body size of all birds providing 30 to 50% of its body surface area, although another Neotropical species, the sword-billed hummingbird, has a longer bill relative to its body length. It was called by Buffon a "grossly monstrous" appendage. Diverse functions have been suggested. Charles Darwin suggested it was a sexual ornament: "toucans may owe the enormous size of their beaks to sexual selection, for the sake of displaying the diversified and vivid stripes of colour with which these organs are ornamented". Further suggestions have included aid in peeling fruit, intimidating other birds when robbing their nests, social selection related to defense of territory, and as a visual warning.

Research has shown that one function is as a surface area for heat exchange. The bill has the ability to modify blood flow and so regulate heat distribution in the body, allowing for the use of the bill as a thermal radiator. In terms of surface area used for this function, the bill relative to the bird's size is amongst the largest of any animal and has a network of superficial blood vessels supporting the thin horny sheath on the bill made of keratin called the rhamphotheca.

In its capacity to remove body heat, the bill is comparable to that of elephant ears. The ability to radiate heat depends upon air speed: if this is low, only 25% of the adult bird's resting heat production is radiated; if high, it radiates as much as four times this heat production. In comparison, the bill of a duck and the ears of an elephant can shed only about 9% of resting heat production. The bill normally is responsible for 30 to 60% of heat loss. The practice of toco toucans of placing their bills under their wings may serve to insulate the bill and reduce heat loss during sleep. It has been observed that "complexities of the vasculature and controlling mechanisms needed to adjust the blood flow to the bill may not be completely developed until adulthood."

Distribution and habitat
The toco toucan occurs in northern and eastern Bolivia, extreme south-eastern Peru, northern Argentina, eastern and central Paraguay, and eastern and southern Brazil (excluding southern Rio Grande do Sul, the dry regions dominated by Caatinga vegetation and coastal regions between Ceará and Rio de Janeiro). Other disjunct populations occur along the lower Amazon River (Ilha de Marajó west approximately to the Madeira River), far northern Brazil in Roraima, coastal regions of the Guianas and it has been recently registered in north-west Uruguay. It only penetrates the Amazon in relatively open areas (e.g. along rivers). It is resident, but local movements may occur.

It is, unlike the other members of the genus Ramphastos, essentially a non-forest species. It can be found in a wide range of semi-open habitats such as woodland, savanna and other open habitats with scattered trees, Cerrado, plantations, forest-edge, and even wooded gardens. It is mainly a species of lowlands, but occurs up to  near the Andes in Bolivia. It is easily seen in the Pantanal.

Behaviour and ecology
The toco toucan eats fruit using its bill to pluck them from trees, but also insects, frogs, small reptiles, small birds and their eggs and nestlings. The long bill is useful for reaching things that otherwise would be out-of-reach. It is typically seen in pairs or small groups. In flight it alternates between a burst of rapid flaps with the relatively short, rounded wings, and gliding. Nesting is seasonal, but timing differs between regions. The nest is typically placed high in a tree and consists of a cavity, at least part of which is excavated by the parent birds themselves. It has also been recorded nesting in holes in earth-banks and terrestrial termite-nests. Their reproduction cycle is annual. The female usually lays two to four eggs a few days after mating. The eggs are incubated by both sexes and hatch after 17–18 days. These birds are very protective of themselves and their chicks.

Aviculture
Like the keel-billed toucan, the toco toucan is sometimes kept in captivity, but has a high fruit diet and is sensitive to hemochromatosis (an iron storage disease). Also, pet toco toucans must not be permitted to eat mouse (or rat) meat, due to a risk of bacterial infection. There is an ongoing population management plan that should help to revert the decreasing captive population of the toco toucan for Association of Zoos and Aquariums member institutions. This is the second management plan that is occurring since 2001.

Status
Because it prefers open habitats, the toco toucan is likely to benefit from the widespread deforestation in tropical South America. It has a large range and except in the outer regions of its range, it typically is fairly common. It is therefore considered to be of Least Concern by BirdLife International.

References

 Gilbert, A. (2002). Toco Toucan (Ramphastos toco). pp. 270–271 in: del Hoyo, J., Elliott, A. & Sargatal, J. eds (2002). Handbook of Birds of the World. Vol. 7. Jacamars to Woodpeckers. Lynx Edicions, Barcelona. 
 Restall, R., Rodner, C. & Lentino, M. (2006). Birds of Northern South America - An Identification Guide. Christopher Helm, London. 
 Short, L. & Horne, J. (2001). Toucans, Barbets and Honeyguides. Oxford University Press, London. 
 Sick, H. (1993). Birds of Brazil - A Natural History. Princeton University Press, West Sussex.

External links

Toco toucan videos on the Internet Bird Collection
Stamps (for Argentina, Bolivia, Brazil, French Guiana, Guyana, Paraguay)

toco toucan
Birds of Bolivia
Birds of Brazil
Birds of the Guianas
Birds of Paraguay
Birds of the Cerrado
Birds of the Pantanal
toco toucan
Birds of the Amazon Basin
toco toucan